Peng Yang (born 17 January 1992) is a Chinese field hockey player. At the 2012 Summer Olympics she competed with the China women's national field hockey team in the women's tournament.

She won a silver medal as a member of the Chinese team at 2014 Asian Games.

References

External links
 

1992 births
Living people
Chinese female field hockey players
Asian Games medalists in field hockey
Asian Games silver medalists for China
Asian Games bronze medalists for China
Field hockey players at the 2012 Summer Olympics
Field hockey players at the 2014 Asian Games
Field hockey players at the 2016 Summer Olympics
Field hockey players at the 2018 Asian Games
Field hockey players at the 2020 Summer Olympics
Medalists at the 2014 Asian Games
Medalists at the 2018 Asian Games
Olympic field hockey players of China
People from Leshan